Paul Leopold Eduard Heinrich Anton Bronsart von Schellendorf (25 January 1832 – 23 June 1891) was a Prussian general and writer, who served as Minister of War from 1883 to 1889.

Family
Bronsart was born in Danzig (present-day Gdańsk, Poland), then administrative capital of West Prussia, the son of later General Lieutenant Heinrich Bronsart von Schellendorff (1803–1874) and his wife Antoinette Martha Elisabeth, née Drège (1810–1873). His younger brother Walther Bronsart von Schellendorff (1833–1914) also served as Prussian Minister of War from 1893 to 1896.

On 30 May 1853, Paul Bronsart married Rosalie Klara Marie, née Schmidt (1833–1913). The couple had four children, among them Fritz Bronsart von Schellendorf (1864–1950), General lieutenant and chief of the Ottoman Army general staff in World War I.

Life and career
Having attended the Gymnasium in Danzig, Bronsart entered the Prussian Cadet Corps (Kadettenanstalt) in Kulm and Berlin. On 28 April 1849 he joined the Berlin Kaiser Franz Garde-Grenadier Regiment No.2 in the rank of lieutenant. From 1 June 1852 he served as adjutant in the 4th Guards Landwehr Regiment and attended the Prussian Military Academy from 1855 to 1858. On 1 May 1859 he was appointed to the German General Staff and achieved the rank of Oberleutnant. Elevated to Hauptmann (Captain) on 23 February 1861; after three years of staff service he returned to regimental duty as a company commander in the II Army Corps, but was soon reappointed to the staff, and lectured at the Military Academy, becoming major in 1865 and lieutenant colonel in 1869.

Bronsart participated in the Austro-Prussian War of 1866 as a member of the II Corps general staff, and fought in the Battle of Gitschin and Königgrätz. During the Franco-Prussian War of 1870/71 he was chief of a section on the Great General Staff headquarters, and conducted the preliminary negotiations for the surrender of the French at the Sedan fortress. After the war Bronsart was made Oberst (colonel) and Chief of Staff of the Guard Corps, becoming major general in 1876, commander of the 1st Guards Infantry Brigade in 1878, and lieutenant general (with a 2nd Guards Infantry Division command) in 1881.

In March 1883 he was appointed Prussian War Minister, succeeding Georg von Kameke. During his tenure of the post, until 1889, the peacetime establishment of the German Army was significantly increased and many important reforms were carried out in the Prussian Army, in particular the arming of the infantry with
repeating rifles as well as new regulations of pension funds and compulsory military service. On 23 April 1888 he was promoted to General of the Infantry.

Minister Bronsart resigned on 8 April 1889 and was succeeded by Julius von Verdy du Vernois. At his request, he was appointed commanding general of the I Army Corps at Königsberg. Two years later he died from pneumonia at his estate of Schettnienen near Heiligenbeil (present-day Mamonovo, Kaliningrad Oblast) at the age of 59.

Conflict with Bismarck 
Jonathan Steinberg's Bismarck: A Life records the following: 
On 18 December Bronsart put his career on the line to frustrate Bismarck's intervention in military matters. As he recorded in his war diary, he had been ordered by Eugen Anton Theophil von Podbielski to provide Bismarck with minutes of a Military Council and decided to obey orders, a court-martial offence. The whole entry records the agony of conscience of one of the most gifted of the 'demi-gods', a lieutenant colonel, a Division Chief in the General Staff, 'for me the hardest day of the entire campaign'. He had received an order from the King approved by the Chief of the General Staff, General Count Moltke, and handed to him by Lieutenant General Podbielski, Quartermaster General of the entire army. As he records the moment of his decision

if a man with the ambitious thirst for power like Count Bismarck were once to be admitted, there would be nothing more to be done...I thought about it for ten minutes; the habit of obedience got me through the address and then it failed me, and the feeling of duty, and the need to be disobedient even to the King, won the upper hand even at the sacrifice of my own person.

He reported to Podbielski that he could not carry out the order in good conscience and submitted his resignation letter at the same time. Podbielski at first flew into a rage and questioned Bronsart's sanity. Then in the face of this act of moral courage by a senior staff officer, he consulted Moltke, who revoked the order and told the King of his decision. Bismarck never got access to the Military Council minutes. Bronsart joins von Werther as two examples of unusual civil courage in the face of Bismarck's increasing dictatorial attitude. As Bronsart concludes the entry:

Had I done the demanded letters, even if I had weakened it as much as possible and rendered it colourless, it would have been approved and sent. Then Count Bismarck would sit in the saddle. He knows very well how to ride, as he once said about Germany. Where this ride would have taken us is not in doubt.

Writings
Bronsart's military writings include three works of great importance: 
Ein Rückblick auf die taktischen Rückblicke (2nd ed., Berlin, 1870), a pamphlet written in reply to Captain May's Tactical Retrospect of 1866; and
Der Dienst des Generalstabes (1st ed., Berlin, 1876; 3rd ed. revised by General Meckel, 1893; new ed. by the author's son, Major Bronsart von Schellendorf, Berlin, 1904), a comprehensive treatise on the duties of the general staff. The third edition of this work was soon after its publication translated into English and issued officially to the British army as The Duties of the General Staff. Major Bronsart's new edition of 1904 was re-issued in English by the General Staff, under the same title, in 1905.
 Schellendorf, Paul Leopold Eduard Heinrich Anton Bronsart. (1893).  Duties of the General Staff, translated by William Aldworth Home Hare. London: Her Majesty's Stationery Office.

Orders and decorations
He received the following awards:

References

1832 births
1891 deaths
Scientists from Gdańsk
Military personnel from Gdańsk
German untitled nobility
German military personnel of the Franco-Prussian War
German military writers
Generals of Infantry (Prussia)
People from the Province of Prussia
German male non-fiction writers
Recipients of the Iron Cross (1870), 1st class
Grand Crosses of the Order of Franz Joseph
Grand Crosses of the Military Merit Order (Bavaria)
Recipients of the Military Merit Cross (Mecklenburg-Schwerin)
Recipients of the Order of the Crown (Italy)
Grand Cordons of the Order of the Rising Sun
Recipients of the Order of the Medjidie, 1st class
Recipients of the Order of St. Anna, 2nd class
Recipients of the Order of St. Vladimir, 3rd class
Commanders First Class of the Order of the Sword